Gerhard Welz (born 1 February 1945 in Frankfurt) is a former professional German footballer.

Welz made a total of 90 appearances in the Fußball-Bundesliga and 137 in the 2. Bundesliga during his playing career.

References 
 

1945 births
Living people
Footballers from Frankfurt
German footballers
Germany B international footballers
Association football goalkeepers
Bundesliga players
2. Bundesliga players
VfL Germania 1894 players
Viktoria Aschaffenburg players
FC Bayern Munich footballers
1. FC Saarbrücken players
1. FC Nürnberg players
1. FC Köln players
SC Preußen Münster players
Tennis Borussia Berlin players
VfB Stuttgart players
SC Fortuna Köln players
Rot-Weiß Oberhausen players